Frederik Julius Kaas was a politician from Denmark who served as Prime Minister of Denmark from 1814 to 1827 and Chairmen of the Privy Council.

References 

Prime Ministers of Denmark